The 2017 New Mexico State Aggies football team represented New Mexico State University in the 2017 NCAA Division I FBS football season. The Aggies played their home games at Aggie Memorial Stadium in Las Cruces, New Mexico, and competed in the Sun Belt Conference. They were led by fifth–year head coach Doug Martin. The Aggies finished the season 6–6 and 4–4 in Sun Belt play to finish in a three-way tie for fifth place. The Aggies received a bowl bid for the first time in 57 years where they beat Utah State in the Arizona Bowl.

Previous season
The Aggies finished the 2016 season 3–9 and 2–6 in Sun Belt play to finish in a three-way tie for eighth place.

Schedule
New Mexico State announced its 2017 football schedule on March 1, 2017. The 2017 schedule consisted of five home and seven away games in the regular season. The Aggies hosted Sun Belt foes Arkansas State, Idaho, South Alabama, and Troy, and traveled to Appalachian State, Georgia Southern, Louisiana–Lafayette, and Texas State.

The Aggies hosted one of the four non-conference opponents, UTEP from Conference USA, and traveled to Arizona State from the Pac-12 Conference, Arkansas from the Southeastern Conference and New Mexico from the Mountain West Conference.
 

Schedule Source:

Game summaries

at Arizona State

at New Mexico

Troy

UTEP

at Arkansas

at Appalachian State

at Georgia Southern

Arkansas State

at Texas State

at Louisiana–Lafayette

Idaho

South Alabama

vs. Utah State–Arizona Bowl

References

New Mexico State
New Mexico State Aggies football seasons
Arizona Bowl champion seasons
New Mexico State Aggies football